Wolfgang Winkler (27 October 1940 – 11 May 2001) was a West German luger who competed in the late 1960s. He won the bronze medal in the men's doubles event at the 1968 Winter Olympics in Grenoble.

References

External links

1940 births
2001 deaths
German male lugers
Lugers at the 1968 Winter Olympics
Lugers at the 1972 Winter Olympics
Olympic bronze medalists for West Germany
Olympic medalists in luge
Medalists at the 1968 Winter Olympics